A planet, in astronomy, is one of a class of celestial bodies that orbit stars. (A dwarf planet is a similar, but officially mutually exclusive, class of body.)

 For articles on specific types of planet, see List of planets

Planet or Planets may also refer to:
 Planets in astrology, celestial bodies used in prophecy
 The planet, a term often used to refer to Earth

As an acronym
 Professional Landcare Network, a US organization for lawn care, landscape architecture and related professionals
 Probing Lensing Anomalies Network, a network of optical astronomical telescopes used for photometry
 Postal Alpha Numeric Encoding Technique, a barcoding system for sorting mail used by the US Postal Service

Computing
 Planet (software), software for collecting posts from RSS feeds and republishing them on a website
 Planet Network, network of video game-related websites operated by GameSpy
 Planet Online, UK Internet service provider
 The Planet Internet Services, large dedicated hosting service provider

Film and television
 The Planet (film), a 2006 Swedish documentary film
The Planets (film), 1983
The Planets, first-season title of The Planets and Beyond, a Science Channel documentary series
 The Planets (1999 TV series), a BBC TV documentary series
 The Planets (2019 TV series), a BBC TV documentary series presented by Professor Brian Cox
Planète (TV channel), a French television channel, now known as Planète+
 Planetes, 2003 Sunrise, Inc. manga and anime television series
Planet or Captain Planet, character in Captain Planet and the Planeteers

Magazines and newspapers
Planet (magazine), a Welsh cultural and political quarterly
Planet Magazine, on-line science fiction magazine
Planet PC, a British computer gaming magazine
Planet Stories, science fiction magazine published from 1939-1955
 Planète (review), a French magazine of the fantastic realism literary movement
 Daily Planet, a fictional newspaper in the Superman universe

Music
 The Planets, a suite of orchestral music by Gustav Holst
 The Planets (band), a classical music band formed by Mike Batt
 Planets (Adema album), by Adema
 Planets, an album by the art rock band One Ring Zero
 Planets (Eloy album), by the German band Eloy from 1982
 "Planets" (song), a 2010 song by the Australian pop-rock band Short Stack
 "Planet", a song from the album Here Today, Tomorrow Next Week! by The Sugarcubes
 Planet, a series of EPs by Basement Jaxx
 "Planets", a song by Avenged Sevenfold from Hail to the King
 The Planet (album), by Young Ejecta

Transport
 Planet (locomotive), an early British steam railway locomotive
 'Planet' trademark for petrol locomotives produced by Kent Construction and Engineering Ltd in England after WW1
 2-2-0, a class of railway locomotives including the latter
 Planet Airways, a US airline
 Cagiva Planet, an Italian motorcycle
The PLANET series of Japanese unmanned spacecraft:
 PLANET-A, alternative name for Suisei (probe)
 PLANET-B, alternative name for Nozomi (probe)
 PLANET-C, alternative name for Akatsuki (probe)
 Name of several German oceanographic research vessels:
SMS Planet (1905), survey ship of the Kaiserliche Marine
Planet (1967), research vessel of the German Navy
Planet (2005), research vessel of the German Navy

Sport
 "The Planets", nickname given to Kenyan association football club Ligi Ndogo S.C.
 Planet (horse), a racing horse

Other uses
 Planet, a Jacques Vert retail clothing brand
 Planet (company), a financial services company specialised in multicurrency payments, credit card processing and the management of Tax-free shopping
 Planet Labs, an American public Earth imaging company

See also
 Planetary (disambiguation)